The following is a list of the television networks and announcers that broadcast the American Football League Championship Game during its existence. After 1969, the AFL merged with the National Football League. Thereafter, the American Football Conference Championship Game replaced the AFL Championship Game.

References

See also
List of Super Bowl broadcasters
List of AFC Championship Game broadcasters
List of NFL Championship Game broadcasters
List of NFC Championship Game broadcasters

Championship Game broadcasters
AFL Championship Game broadcasters
Broadcasters
AFL Championship Game broadcasters
AFL Championship Game broadcasters
AFL Championship Game broadcasters